Erythroxylum kochummenii is a species of plant in the Erythroxylaceae family. It is a tree endemic to Peninsular Malaysia. It is threatened by habitat loss.

References

kochummenii
Endemic flora of Peninsular Malaysia
Trees of Peninsular Malaysia
Vulnerable flora of Asia
Taxonomy articles created by Polbot